The 2012 Crawley Borough Council election took place on 3 May 2012 to elect members of Crawley District Council in West Sussex, England. One third of the council was up for election. The Conservative Party retained overall control of the council.

After the election, the composition of the council was as follows:
Conservative 21
Labour 16

Ward results

Bewbush

Broadfield North

Broadfield South

Gossops Green

Ifield

Langley Green

Maidenbower

Pound Hill North

Pound Hill South and Worth

Southgate

Three Bridges

Tilgate

Note: This Tilgate seat was won by the Conservatives at the previous regular election in 2008, but gained by Labour in a by-election in 2010

West Green

References

2012 English local elections
2012
2010s in West Sussex